Shahrak-e Beheshti (also Romanized as Shahrak-e Beheshtī) is a village in Bagheli-ye Marama Rural District, in the Central District of Gonbad-e Qabus County, Golestan Province, Iran. At the 2006 census, its population was 1,737, in 359 families.

References 

Populated places in Gonbad-e Kavus County